This was the first edition of the Neox Fan Awards, created by Atresmedia and Fanta for teenage audiences to honor the best of the year in films, television, music and sports. The show featured live performances by La Oreja de Van Gogh and Auryn.

Also, a contest was held amongst every fan who voted for the awards. The winner, Carla Martín, was given the chance to present one of the awards alongside Berta Collado.

Awards

Film

Music

Television

Sports

Neox awards

Fanta awards

References

2012 awards